Triple functional domain protein is a protein that in humans is encoded by the TRIO gene.

Interactions 

TRIO (gene) has been shown to interact with Filamin and RHOA.

References

Further reading

External links 
 

EC 2.7.11